Ahmedabad–Gandhinagar Capital MEMU is a Mainline electric multiple unit train belonging to Western Railway zone that runs between  in Gujarat and  of Gujarat . It is currently being operated with 69131/69132 train numbers on a daily basis.

Route and halts

The important halts of the train are:

See also

 Gandhinagar Capital railway station
 Anand–Gandhinagar Capital MEMU

References

External links 

 69131/Ahmedabad-Gandhinagar MEMU
 69132/Gandhinagar-Ahmedabad MEMU

Transport in Ahmedabad
Transport in Gandhinagar
Electric multiple units in Gujarat